Khararud Rural District is in the Central District of Khodabandeh County, Zanjan province, Iran. At the National Census of 2006, its population was 22,070 in 4,754 households. There were 22,634 inhabitants in 6,222 households at the following census of 2011. At the most recent census of 2016, the population of the rural district was 17,981 in 5,107 households. The largest of its 35 villages was Mahmudabad, with 2,802 people.

References 

Khodabandeh County

Rural Districts of Zanjan Province

Populated places in Zanjan Province

Populated places in Khodabandeh County